is a Quasi-National Park in Mie and Nara Prefectures, Japan. It was established in 1970.

Places of interest
 Nara: Mount Takami, Murō-ji, Ōno-ji

Related municipalities
 Mie: Iga, Matsusaka, Nabari, Tsu
 Nara: Higashiyoshino, Mitsue, Nara, Sakurai, Soni, Uda

See also

 List of national parks of Japan

References

External links
  Map of parks in Nara Prefecture
  Map of parks in Mie Prefecture

National parks of Japan
Parks and gardens in Mie Prefecture
Parks and gardens in Nara Prefecture
Protected areas established in 1970